Sargayevo (Harğay) is a rural locality (a village) in Makarovsky Selsoviet, Ishimbaysky District, Bashkortostan, Russia. The population was 64 in 2010. There is one street.

Geography 
Isyakayevo is the nearest rural locality.

References 

Rural localities in Ishimbaysky District